The Legislature of the Hawaiian Kingdom was the bicameral (later unicameral) legislature of the Hawaiian Kingdom. A royal legislature was first provided by the 1840 Constitution and the 1852 Constitution was the first to use the term Legislature of the Hawaiian Islands, and the first to subject the monarch to certain democratic principles. Prior to this the monarchs ruled under a Council of Chiefs (ʻAha Aliʻi).

Structure 
The Legislature from 1840 to 1864 was bicameral and originally consisted of a lower House of Representatives and an upper House of Nobles as provided for under the Constitutions of the Kingdom of 1840 and 1852, until abolished by the 1864 Constitution which then provided for a unicameral Legislature.

House of Nobles 
The members of the upper House of Nobles (Hale ʻAhaʻōlelo Aliʻi) were appointed by the Monarch with the advice of his Privy Council. It also served as the court of impeachment for any royal official. Members were usually Hawaiian aliʻis, nobles, and royal or wealthy individuals. The position had no salary.
It originally consisted of the King or Queen plus five women and ten men.  After the overthrow of the Kingdom and the subsequent United States annexation in 1898, this body was reconstituted as a Senate under the territorial constitution of the Territory of Hawaii.

House of Representatives 
The members of the lower House of Representatives (Hale ʻAhaʻōlelo Makaʻāinana) were elected by popular vote from several districts in the Kingdom. Revenue-oriented bills were issued through the House of Representatives, and it also served as the "grand inquest" of the Kingdom.

History 
From 1840 to 1864, it existed as a bicameral parliament. However, with the 1864 Constitution, the Legislature was temporarily unified into a single-house (unicameral) legislature. This Constitution also created property and literacy requirements for both Legislature members and voters; these requirements were later repealed by the Legislature in 1874 during the reign of King Lunalilo. The subsequent 1887 Constitution restored the two chambers as a bicameral legislature and made the revived  upper House of Nobles elected to six-year terms, with higher property ownership requirements.

After 1893, and the Overthrow of the Hawaiian Kingdom, it became the Legislature of the brief Republic of Hawaii, followed in 1898 by the Territory of Hawaii after the American annexation. This was followed 61 years later by the present Hawaii State Legislature in 1959 after the admission to the Union of the Territory as the 50th State. It now consists of the lower Hawaii House of Representatives and upper house of the Hawaii Senate as the bicameral legislative body of the State of Hawaii under the 1959 Hawaii Admission Act and Constitution.

Presidents of the House of Nobles 
 King Kamehameha III (1840–1851)
 Keoni Ana (1852–1854)
 Lot Kamehameha (1855)
 Keoni Ana (1856)
 Legislature did not meet in 1857
 Mataio Kekūanāoʻa (1858–1860)
 Legislature did not meet in 1861
 Lot Kamehameha (1862)
 Legislature didn't meet in 1863

Speaker of the House of Representatives 
 William Little Lee (1851)
 George Morison Robertson (1852–1853)
 Asa Goodale Tyerman Thurston (1854)
 George Morison Robertson (1855–1856)
 Legislature did not meet in 1857
 George Morison Robertson (1858–1859)
 James W. Austin (1859)
 Lawrence McCully (1860)
 Legislature did not meet in 1861
 William Webster (1862)
 Legislature did not meet in 1863

Presidents of the Legislature 
 Mataio Kekūanāoʻa (1864–1868)
 Paul Nahaolelua (1870–1874)
 Charles Reed Bishop (1874)
 Godfrey Rhodes (1876–1878)
 Charles Reed Bishop (1880)
 Godfrey Rhodes (1882–1884)
 John Smith Walker (1886)
 Samuel Gardner Wilder (1887)
 William Richards Castle (1887)
 Samuel Gardner Wilder (1888)
 William Richards Castle (1888)
 John Smith Walker (1890–1893)

Vice-Presidents of the Legislature 
 Samuel Northrup Castle (1864)
 Godfrey Rhodes (1866)
 John Mott-Smith (1867), pro tempore
 Godfrey Rhodes (1868)
 Harvey Rexford Hitchcock Jr. (1870)
 David Howard Hitchcock Sr. (1872–1873)
 Simon Kaloa Kaʻai (1874)
 Luther Aholo (1876–1886)
 John Kauhane (1887–1893)

See also
1892 Legislative Session of the Hawaiian Kingdom
Cabinet of the Hawaiian Kingdom
Privy Council of the Hawaiian Kingdom
Supreme Court of the Hawaiian Kingdom

Further reading

References 

Hawaiian Kingdom
Hawaii law
 
Hawaii, Kingdom
1840 establishments in Hawaii
1893 disestablishments in Hawaii